Pereshchepnoye is a rural locality (a khutor) in Kopenkinskoye Rural Settlement, Rossoshansky District, Voronezh Oblast, Russia. The population was 96 as of 2010. There are 2 streets.

Geography 
Pereshchepnoye is located 27 km south of Rossosh (the district's administrative centre) by road. Kopenkina is the nearest rural locality.

References 

Rural localities in Rossoshansky District